This is a list of hospitals in Zambia. The list is not exhaustive. You can expand the list by adding referenced content as appropriate.

Classification
Hospitals in Zambia are divided into three main categories: (1) Specialist Hospitals (Tertiary Referral Hospitals or Third Level Hospitals) (2) General Hospitals (Provincial Hospitals or Second Level Hospitals) and (3) District Hospitals (First Level Hospitals).

Third Level Hospitals
As of December 2020, there were six Level 3 hospitals in Zambia.

 University Teaching Hospital (1,655 beds), Lusaka
 Levy Mwanawasa University Teaching Hospital (826 beds), Lusaka
 Ndola Central Hospital (800 beds), Ndola
 Kitwe Central Hospital (630 beds), Kitwe
 Cancer Diseases Hospital (252 beds), Lusaka
 Chainama Hills Mental Hospital (210 beds), Lusaka
 Arthur Davison Children's Hospital (250 beds), Ndola.

Second Level hospitals
As of December 2012, there were 19 Level 2 hospitals in the country.
 Levy Mwanawasa General Hospital, Lusaka

 Chipata General Hospital, Chipata
 Choma General Hospital, Choma 
 Mukinge Mission Hospital, Kasempa
 Mwandi Mission Hospital, Mwandi
 Nchanga North Hospital, Chingola 
 Nchanga South Hospital, Chingola
 Chikankata Mission Hospital, Mazabuka
 Kalene Mission Hospital, Kalene Hill
 St. Francis Hospital, Katete
 Lewanika General Hospital, Mongu
 Kabwe General Hospital, Kabwe
 Kabwe Mine Hospital, Kabwe
 Kalulushi Mine Hospital, Kalulushi
 Wusakile Mine Hospital, Kitwe
 Roan Antelope Hospital, Luanshya
 Malcom Watson Hospital, Mufulira
 Ronald Ross General Hospital, Mufulira
 Mansa General Hospital, Mansa
 Chilonga Mission Hospital, Chilonga, Mpika District
 Kasama General Hospital, Kasama
 Mbala General Hospital, Mbala
 Chavuma Mission Hospital, Chavuma
 Solwezi General Hospital, Solwezi
 Livingstone General Hospital, Livingstone, Zambia
 Monze Mission Hospital, Monze

First Level hospitals
As of December 2012, there were 85 Level 1 hospitals in the country, including the following:
 Medcross Hospital, Lusaka District
 Kaoma District Hospital, Kaoma District
 Liteta Hospital, Chibombo District
 Kapiri Mposhi Hospital, Kapiri Mposhi District
 Mkushi District Hospital, Mkushi District
 Mumbwa District Hospital, Mumbwa District
 Nangoma Mission Hospital, Mumbwa District
 Chitambo Hospital, Serenje District
 Serenje District Hospital, Serenje District
 Itezhi-Tezhi District Hospital, Itezhi-Tezhi District
 Konkola Mine Hospital, Chililabombwe District 
 Sinozam Hospital, Kitwe District
 Luanshya District Hospital, Luanshya District
 Thomson Hospital, Luanshya District 
 Kamuchanga District Hospital, Mufulira District
 Hill Top Hospital 1, Ndola District
 Mpongwe Mission Hospital, Mpongwe District
 St.Theresa Mission Hospital, Mpongwe District
 Mwami Adventist Hospital, Chipata District
 Lundazi District Hospital, Lundazi District
 Kamoto Mission Hospital, Mambwe District
 Nyimba District Hospital, Nyimba District
 Minga Mission Hospital, Petauke District
 Nyanje Mission Hospital, Petauke District
 Petauke District Hospital, Petauke District
 Kawambwa District Hospital, Kawambwa District
 Mbereshi Mission Hospital, Kawambwa District
 St. Paul's Hospital, Nchelenge District 
 Kasaba Mission Hospital, Samfya District
 Lubwe Mission Hospital, Samfya District
 Samfya District Hospital, Samfya District
 Human Service Trust Hospice, Chilanga District
 Chongwe District Hospital, Chongwe District
 Kafue District Hospital, Kafue District
 Katondwe Mission Hospital, Luangwa District
 St. John’s Medical Centre, Lusaka District
 MKP Trust Medical Hospital, Kabulonga, Lusaka (Private)
 Hill Top Hospital 2, Lusaka District
 Mpanshya Mission Hospital, Rufunsa District
 Chama District Hospital, Chama District
 Chinsali District Hospital, Chinsali District
 Isoka District Hospital, Isoka District 
 Mpika District Hospital, Mpika District
 Luwingu District Hospital, Luwingu District
 Mporokoso District Hospital, Mporokoso District
 Kalene Mission Hospital, Ikelenge District
 Kabompo District Hospital, Kabompo District
 Loloma Mission Hospital, Kabompo District
 Mukinge Mission Hospital, Kasempa District
 Mufumbwe District Hospital, Mufumbwe District
 Luwi Mission Hospital, Mwinilunga District
 Mwinilunga District Hospital, Mwinilunga District
 Chitokoloki Mission Hospital, Zambezi District
 Zambezi District Hospital, Zambezi District
 Macha Mission Hospital, Macha, Choma District 
 Gwembe District Hospital, Gwembe District
 Kalomo District Hospital, Kalomo District
 Zimba Mission Hospital, Kalomo District 
 Kafue Gorge Hospital, Mazabuka District
 Mazabuka District Hospital, Mazabuka District
 Chikuni Mission Hospital, Monze District
 Namwala District Hospital, Namwala District
 Mtendere Mission Hospital, Chirundu, Siavonga District
 Siavonga District Hospital, Siavonga District
 Maamba Hospital, Sinazongwe District
 Kalabo District Hospital, Kalabo District
 Yuka Adventist Hospital, Kalabo District
 Kaoma District Hospital, Kaoma District
 Luampa Mission Hospital, Kaoma District
 Mangango Mission Hospital, Kaoma District
 Lukulu District Hospital, Lukulu District
 Senanga District Hospital, Senanga District
Matero Level One Hospital Lusaka District
Chilenje Level One Hospital Lusaka District
Chipata Level One Hospital Lusaka District
Kanyama Level One Hospital Lusaka District
Chawama Level One Hospital Lusaka District

 Medland Hospital (72 beds), Lusaka  www.medlandhospital.com

Security forces hospitals
 Mt. Eugenia Level 1 Hospital: (Zambia Air Force), Chilanga District
 Arakan Camp Military Hospital: (Zambia Armed Forces), Lusaka District
 Maina Soko Level 1 Hospital: (Zambia Armed Forces), Lusaka District

References

External links
Website of the Zambian Ministry of Health
Medcross Hospital

Medical and health organisations based in Zambia
Lists of buildings and structures in Zambia
Zambia
Zambia